701 may refer to:
701, the year
701 series, a Japanese train type
IBM 701, IBM's first commercial computer
IBM ThinkPad 701, a subnotebook series by IBM
701, a common name for the Yamaha Superjet
 Seven-O-One, or 701, a Canadian information television series (1960–1963)
Area code 701 for North Dakota, United States
El Chapo who placed number 701 on the Forbes list of billionaires 2009